The 3rd constituency of Doubs (French: Troisième circonscription du Doubs) is one of five electoral districts in the department of the same name, each of which returns one deputy to the French National Assembly in elections using the two-round system, with a run-off if no candidate receives more than 50% of the vote in the first round.

Description
The constituency is made up of the eight former cantons of Baume-les-Dames, Clerval, L'Isle-sur-le-Doubs, Maîche, Montbéliard-Est, Montbéliard-Ouest, Rougemont, and Saint-Hippolyte.

It includes the town of Montbéliard and nearly surrounds the department's 4th constituency. In the east it reaches deep into the Jura mountains, where it is bordered by Switzerland.

At the time of the 1999 census (which was the basis for the most recent redrawing of constituency boundaries, carried out in 2010) the 3rd constituency had a total population of 93,407.

The seat has generally been held by conservative parties except on the occasions of the Socialist landslides in the 1988 and 1997.

Historic representation

Election results

2022 

 
 
|-
| colspan="8" bgcolor="#E9E9E9"|
|-
 
 

 
 
 
 
 

* Nadey stood as a dissident LR member without the support of the party or the UDC alliance.

2017

2012

Sources
Official results of French elections from 2002: "Résultats électoraux officiels en France" (in French).

3